Muhammad Ali Navruzov (born August 23, 1991, Tashkent, Uzbekistan) is an Uzbek social media personality, singer and actor. Muhammad Ali achieved great success in the field of acting. Muhammad Ali gained widespread recognition and recognition in Uzbekistan after starring in the 2008 Uzbek drama “Yigitlar”. Since then, he has starred in many Uzbek comedy films. In particular, the films "Shaharlik olifta", which was released on the big screens in 2010, and "Oxirgi qarz" brought the actress great popularity.

Muhammad Ali became famous in Uzbekistan in 2009 with the song "Xato" as a singer. Since 2015, Muhammad Ali has written songs in Uzbek, Russian and English languages.

Biography 
Muhammad Ali Yuldashev was born on August 23, 1991, in Tashkent. His mother, Zebo Navruzova, is a film director, and his brothers Shohruhkhon and Shuhrat are singers. Muhammad Ali graduated from the Khamza Music School No. 3 and the Tashkent Variety and Circus School, then entered the Tashkent State Institute of Culture named after Abdulla Qadiri.

In 2006, he made his debut role in the film "The Oath" (Qasamyod). He started his professional career in 2009.

Muhammad Ali Navruzov is known as a singer under the pseudonym Ali.

Discography

Singles

 2009 Xato

 2018 Lambo
 2019 Do Utra (feat. Massa)
 2020 Yana-Yana
 2020 Bon appetite
 2020 Dekabr
 2021 Onam 
 2021 Yuragim
 2021 Xop- xop
 2023 Necha Bora Ketarding(feat Shohruhxon)

Filmography

References

External links 
 
 Muhammad Ali Navruzov on Instagram

Living people
Uzbekistani film actors
1991 births
Mass media people from Tashkent